Bandar-e Nakhilu (also Romanized as Bandar-e Nakhīlū; also known as Nahkīlu, Nahkīlū, and Nakhilu) is a village in Moqam Rural District, Shibkaveh District, Bandar Lengeh County, Hormozgan Province, Iran. At the 2006 census, its population was 275, in 36 families.

References 

Populated places in Bandar Lengeh County